Harfordia is a genus of sea snails, marine gastropod mollusks in the subfamily Fusininae  of the family Fasciolariidae, the spindle snails, the tulip snails and their allies.

Species
Species within the genus Harfordia include:
 † Harfordia arnoldi (Cossmann, 1903) 
 Harfordia chucksnelli Callomon & Snyder, 2017
 Harfordia harfordii (Stearns, 1871)
 Harfordia mcleani Callomon & Snyder, 2017
 Harfordia robusta (Trask, 1855)

References

External links
 Callomon P. & Snyder M.A. (2017). A new genus and nine new species in the Fasciolariidae (Gastropoda: Buccinoidea) from southern California and western Mexico. Proceedings of the Academy of Natural Sciences of Philadelphia. 165(1): 55-80

Harfordia (gastropod)